Monica Brown may refer to:

 Monica (singer) (Monica Denise Brown, born 1980), American singer
 Monica Lin Brown (born 1988), US soldier
 Monica Brown (author) (born 1969), Peruvian-American academic and author